Kim Tae-Wook  (born 9 July 1987) is a South Korean footballer.

Club career statistics

External links 

1987 births
Living people
Association football midfielders
South Korean footballers
Gyeongnam FC players
Daejeon Korail FC players
K League 1 players
Korea National League players